Michel Boutant (born 23 November 1956) is a French politician. A member of the Socialist Party, he has served as Mayor of Chabanais since 2020. From 2008 to 2020, Boutant was a member of the Senate of France, representing the Charente department.

References

1956 births
Living people
Socialist Party (France) politicians
French Senators of the Fifth Republic
Senators of Charente
Place of birth missing (living people)